Adlington is a surname. Notable people with the surname include:

 James Adlington (1872–after 1896), English footballer
 Rebecca Adlington (born 1989), English swimmer
 Sarah Adlington (born 1986), British judoka
 Terry Adlington (1935–1994), English footballer
 William Adlington, English translator

References 

English-language surnames
English toponymic surnames